Preved is a term used in the Padonkaffsky jargon, a meme in the Russian-speaking Internet which developed out of a heavily circulated picture, and consists of choosing alternative spellings for words for comic effect. The picture, a modified version of John Lurie's watercolor Bear Surprise, whose popularity was stoked by emails and blogs, features a man and a woman having sex in the clearing of a forest, being surprised by a bear calling "Surprise!" with its paws raised. In later Russian adaptations, the bear shouts "Preved!" (a deliberate misspelling of privet,  – "hi!").

The word and the bear image have found their way into the mainstream mass media, such as a poster for the Russian edition of Newsweek. On July 6, 2006 there was an online conference with Vladimir Putin, prior to which the question "PREVED, Vladimir Vladimirovich! How do you regard MEDVED?" became the most popular, with 28,424 votes. No answer was given, but the Associated Press, informing on the questions collection process, reportedly interpreted it as a reference to then-vice-prime-minister Dmitry Medvedev. 

Eventually, it has become known that the author of the altered picture with the word "preved" was user Lobzz from site Dirty.ru, real name Roman Yatsenko. The authorship of the word itself is still unclear, although the "unfinished" version, "prevet" was traced to 2003.

Preved is identified by a specific pattern of alternative spelling which emerged from the word. In this pattern, voiceless consonants are replaced with their voiced counterparts, and unstressed vowels are interchanged pair-wise – a and o stand in for each other, as do e and i.

The larger trend of alternative spellings, called "olbansky yazyk" ("Olbanian language", misspelled "Albanian") developed from the padonki movement which originated on sites such as udaff.com. That trend uses the opposite conversion from the Preved trend – voiced consonants are replaced with their voiceless counterparts (which are sometimes doubled). For vowels, o is replaced with a and e with i. The latter exhibits a sort of eye dialect.

See also
Eye dialect

References

External links
 http://www.preved-medved.deviantart.com the DeviantArt community about Preved
 Online transformation of standard Russian into Internet slang

Russian Internet slang
Internet memes
Nonstandard spelling